4BC is a radio station in Brisbane, Queensland, owned by parent company Nine Radio, a division of Nine Entertainment Co. It broadcasts on 882 kHz AM and is Brisbane's only commercial talkback station.

While the station's broadcasting facility is at Cannon Hill, its transmitting tower is located alongside the Gateway Motorway in Nudgee.

On Friday, 8 October 2021, 4BC moved to 882 kHz, which was used by its sister station, 4BH, which moved to 1116 kHz.

History

4BC was one of the first radio stations in Brisbane.  It was established in 1930 by John Beals Chandler, an electrical appliance retailer and later Lord Mayor of Brisbane. In March 1937 the station was sold for £A50,000 (equivalent to $ million in ) to the Australian Broadcasting Company who took control in April.

The original studio was located in the Wintergarden Building in Queen St and in 1954 the station moved to the corner of Wharf and Adelaide St into what was originally a vinegar factory. The original transmitter site was located at Fig Tree Pocket and was a two tower 5 kW directional array. In 1988 the studio was relocated to 30 Macrossan St and that installation included a Ku band satellite uplink for the first time. In 2004 the station moved from its CBD location at 30 Macrossan Street to new purpose built premises at Cannon Hill in 2004. Fairfax acquired ownership in 2007.

Programming
In December 2013, 4BC management unveiled an almost complete replacement of on-air talent for 2014. Most continued into early 2015. However, in April 2015, management announced a number of programs would be immediately axed, and a number of announcing staff made redundant, following the merger of Fairfax Radio Network and Macquarie Radio Network. These included long-time presenter and newsreader Walter Williams, Loretta Ryan, Ian Skippen, and former Seven News reporter Patrick Condren.

Prior to April 2015, 4BC produced all of its own programming, including a Queensland-wide morning program, from Brisbane which were presented by local announcers.  In April 2015, most of those programs were axed with the exception of one local afternoon drive show.

Program Times (In AEST Format)

Weekdays 

 Overnights with Michael McLaren| 12:00am (Midnight) - 4:00am (Simulcast from 2GB)
 Wake Up Australia with Michael McLaren| 4:00am - 5:30am (Simulcast from 2GB)
 4BC Breakfast with Laurel Edwards, Gary Clare and Mark Hine | 5:30am – 9:00am
 The Ray Hadley Morning Show | 9:00am – 12:00pm (Noon) (Simulcast from 2GB)
 Afternoons with Sofie Formica | 12:00pm (Noon) - 3:00pm
 Brisbane Live with Neil Breen | 3:00pm – 6:00pm
 4BC Wide World of Sports with Peter Psaltis | 6:00pm – 7:00pm (Monday-Thursday)
 Money News with Brooke Corte | 7:00pm – 8:00pm (Monday-Thursday) (Simulcast Nationally)
 Nights with John Stanley | 8:00pm – 12:00am (Midnight) (Simulcast from 2GB)

Weekends 

 Overnights with Luke Grant | 12:00am (Midnight) - 5:00am (Simulcast from 2GB)
 Weekend Breakfast with Bill McDonald | 6:00am – 8:00am
 Life & Technology with Charlie Brown| 8:00am – 9:00am (Saturday Mornings) (Simulcast Nationally)
 The House Of Wellness | 8:00am – 9:00am (Sunday Mornings) (Simulcast Nationally)
 Weekends with Spencer Howson | 9:00am – 1:00pm
 The Continuous Call Team | 1:00pm – 10:00pm (Saturdays), 1:00pm – 7:00pm (Sundays) (NRL Season Only)
 The Two Murrays with Murray Olds & Murray Wilton | 1:00pm – 7:00pm (Simulcast from 2GB) (Airs outside of NRL season)
 Saturday Nights with Bill Woods | 7:00pm – 10:00pm (Saturday Nights) (Simulcast from 2GB) (Airs outside of NRL season)
 The Ray Hadley Country Music Countdown | 10:00pm – 12:00pm (Saturday Nights) (Simulcast from 2GB)
 Healthy Living with Dr. Ross Walker | 7:00pm – 8:00pm (Sunday Nights) (Simulcast Nationally)
 Sunday Nights with Bill Crews | 8:00pm – 12:00am (Simulcast from 2GB)

Management
 Max Dudley (Content Manager)

See also
Fairfax Media
Nine Radio

Former Presenters
Ben Davis, January 2014 until June 2018.
Jamie Dunn, January 2009 until October 2010.
 Ian Calder, January 2009 until October 2010.

References

External links
4BC website

Radio stations in Brisbane
News and talk radio stations in Australia
Radio stations established in 1930
Nine Radio